Skai 100.3 (or Skai Radio) is a Greek informational and entertainment radio station, the larger an audience in Greece, that broadcasts a wide variety of spoken-word programs, including news, sports, culture, and comedy.

Skai 100.3 is part of the Skai Group one of the largest media groups in Greece. From its beginning in 1989 (then called Sky 100.4) has been in cooperation with BBC World Service, Deutsche Welle and Voice of America. In 2007, joined forces with other European radio stations for the creation of Euranet. The CEO of SKAI 100.3 is Aris Portosalte, a notable journalist well known for his commentary on the news of Skai TV. He has a morning show.

Logos

See also
Skai TV
Skai Group

References

External links
Skai 100.3 Website 

Skai Group
Radio stations established in 1989
Greek-language radio stations
Radio stations in Greece
1989 establishments in Greece